Jibert is a commune in Brașov County, Transylvania, Romania. It is composed of five villages: Dacia (until 1931 Ștena), Grânari, Jibert, Lovnic and Văleni.

The commune is located in the northwestern part of the county, on the border with Sibiu County.

At the 2011 census, 68.6% of inhabitants were Romanians, 15.7% Hungarians, 12.9% Roma, and 2.8% Germans.

The House of Soterius von Sachsenheim is a Transylvanian Saxon noble family originating from the village Stein (present-day Dacia), in the former Saxon  administrative division.

Natives
 Gheorghe Langa

References

Communes in Brașov County
Localities in Transylvania